The Stolpersteine in Croatia lists the Stolpersteine in the Republic of Croatia. Stolpersteine is the German name for stumbling blocks collocated all over Europe by German artist Gunter Demnig. They remember the fate of the Nazi victims being murdered, deported, exiled or driven to suicide.

Generally, the stumbling blocks are posed in front of the building where the victims had their last self-chosen residence. Until now in Croatia there has been only one collocation of Stolpersteine—in 2013 in the Adriatic town Rijeka (in Italian: Fiume). From 1466, this town was under Habsburg rule for four and half centuries, at last with two-thirds of its inhabitants being of Italian descent. Thereafter, Rijeka was independent for some years. From 1924 to the end of WW2, the city belonged to Italy. The name of the Stolpersteine in Croatian is Kamen spoticanja, and in Italian:  pietre d'inciampo.

Rijeka

Dates of collocations 
The collocation in Rijeka took place on 21 May 2013. For both victims two Stolpersteine were posed, one in Croatian and one in Italian. The planned collocation of a Stolperstein for Branko Lustig in Osijek on 22 May 2013 has probably not taken place.

See also 
 The Holocaust in the Independent State of Croatia
 List of cities by country that have stolpersteine

Notes

References

External links

 stolpersteine.eu, Demnig's website
 Ebrei a Fiume e Abbazia, Inschlicht—Luzio 

Lists of stolpersteine in Croatia
World War II memorials in Croatia